Irish phonology varies from dialect to dialect; there is no standard pronunciation of Irish. Therefore, this article focuses on phenomena shared by most or all dialects, and on the major differences among the dialects. Detailed discussion of the dialects can be found in the specific articles: Ulster Irish, Connacht Irish, and Munster Irish.

Irish phonology has been studied as a discipline since the late 19th century, with numerous researchers publishing descriptive accounts of dialects from all regions where the language is spoken. More recently, Irish phonology has been the focus of theoretical linguists.

One of the most important aspects of Irish phonology is that almost all consonants (but ) come in pairs, a "broad" and  a "slender" pronunciation. Broad consonants are either velarized (◌ˠ; back of tongue is pulled back and slightly up in the direction of the soft palate during articulation) or simply velar (for example). Slender consonants are palatalized (◌ʲ; tongue pushed up towards  hard palate during articulation). The contrast between broad and slender consonants is crucial in Irish, because the meaning of a word can change if a broad consonant is substituted for a slender consonant or vice versa. The contrast between broad and slender consonants plays a critical role not only in distinguishing the individual consonants themselves, but also in the pronunciation of the surrounding vowels, in the determination of which consonants can stand next to each other, and in the behaviour of words that begin with a vowel. This broad/slender distinction is similar to the hard/soft one of several Slavic languages, like Russian.

Irish shares a number of phonological characteristics with its nearest linguistic relatives, Scottish Gaelic and Manx, as well as with Hiberno-English, which it currently has the most language contact with.

History of the discipline

Until the end of the 19th century, linguistic discussions of Irish focused either on the traditional grammar (issues like the inflection of nouns, verbs and adjectives) or on the historical development of sounds from Proto-Indo-European through Proto-Celtic to Old Irish. From 1944 to 1968 the Dublin Institute for Advanced Studies published a series of monographs, each describing the phonology of one local dialect:  for West Muskerry in County Cork (Ballyvourney, Coolea and vicinity),  (first published 1945) for Cois Fhairrge in County Galway (Barna, Spiddal, Inverin and vicinity),  for An Rinn in County Waterford,  for Tourmakeady in County Mayo,  for Teelin, County Donegal,  for Erris in County Mayo.

Consonants
Most dialects of Irish contain at a minimum the consonant phonemes shown in the following chart (see International Phonetic Alphabet for an explanation of the symbols). The consonant  is neither broad nor slender.

On- and offglides
Broad (velar(ized)) consonants have a noticeable velar offglide (a very short vowel-like sound) before front vowels, which sounds like the English  but without rounding. This velar offglide is labialized (pronounced [w]) after labial consonants, so   ('yellow') is pronounced .

Similarly, slender (palatal(ized)) consonants have a palatal offglide (like English ) before back vowels, e.g.   ('thick') is pronounced .

When a broad consonant follows a front vowel, there is a very short vowel sound  (called an onglide) just before the consonant, e.g. ('sell') is pronounced . Similarly, when a slender consonant follows a back vowel, there is an onglide  before the consonant, e.g.

These all are also a feature of the northern Slavic languages such as Russian or Polish, and a feature of Lithuanian, so speakers and learners of those languages have an advantage with Irish pronunciation.

Allophones
 (written as ) has two basic allophones: the labiovelar approximant  and the velarized voiced labiodental fricative . The distribution of these allophones varies from dialect to dialect. In Munster, generally only  is found, and in Ulster generally only  is found. In Connacht,  is found word-initially before vowels (e.g. 'saint',   'autumn', and   'hurried').

The remaining labial fricatives are typically labiodental , but they as well as the fricative allophone  of  have bilabial allophones  in many dialects; the distribution depends partly on environment (bilabials are more likely to be found adjacent to rounded vowels) and partly on the individual speaker.

Most coronals are alveolar, except broad stops and approximates which are typically dental , and the slender fricative is typically postalveolar .  may be realized as alveolo-palatal affricates  in a number of dialects, including Tourmakeady, Erris, and Teelin.

 may be true palatals  or palatovelars .

 has three allophones in most dialects: a palatal approximant  before vowels (except ) and syllable-finally (e.g.   'nice',   'will be'); a voiced (post)palatal fricative  before consonants (e.g.   'sun'); and an intermediate sound  (with more frication than  but less frication than ) before  (e.g.   'straightened').

 has the primary allophone .

In many varieties,  and  alternate with  under a variety of circumstances. ('I would give'),   ('drove'). In Munster,  becomes  after a vowel, e.g. ('twenty'). In Ring, final  becomes  in monosyllabic words, e.g. ('fear'). In some Ulster varieties, e.g. ('not'), be deleted word-finally or before , e.g.

As in English, voiceless stops are aspirated (articulated with a puff of air immediately upon release) at the start of a word, while voiced stops may be incompletely voiced but are never aspirated. 'it's crooked'). Several researchers (e.g.

Fortis and lenis sonorants
In Old Irish, the sonorants (those spelled ) were divided not only into broad and slender types, but also into fortis and lenis types. The precise phonetic definition of these terms is somewhat vague, but the coronal fortis sounds (spelled ) were probably longer in duration and may have had a larger area of contact between the tongue and the roof of the mouth than the lenis sounds. Fortis  was probably a normal , while lenis  was a nasalized semivowel , perhaps tending towards a nasalized fricative  or  when palatalized. Thus Old Irish had four rhotic phonemes , four lateral phonemes , and four coronal nasal phonemes . Fortis and lenis sonorants contrasted with each other between vowels and word-finally after vowels in Old Irish, e.g. ('he shears') vs.   ('he may carry');   ('hazel') vs.   ('sin');   ('stake') vs.   ('sound'). Word-initially, only the fortis sounds were found, but they became lenis in environments where morphosyntactically triggered lenition was found:   ('mystery') vs.   ('his mystery'),   ('provision') vs.   ('his provision').

For the laterals and nasals, some dialects have kept all four distinct, while others have reduced them to three or two distinct phonemes, as summarized in the following table.

As for fortis and lenis , in time the lenis version (nasalized semivowel or labial fricative) came to be pronounced as a regular semivowel or fricative along with nasalization of the preceding vowel.

Vowels

The vowels of Ulster Irish are more divergent and are not discussed in this article.

Vowel backness
The backness of vowels (that is, the horizontal position of the highest point of the tongue) depends to a great extent on the quality (broad or slender) of adjacent consonants. Some researchers (e.g. Under this view, these phonemes are not marked at an abstract level as either front vowels or back vowels. Rather, they acquire a specification for frontness or backness from the consonants around them. In this article, however, the more traditional assumption that  are four distinct phonemes will be followed. Unless otherwise noted, however, they largely hold for other Munster and Connacht accents as well.

Close vowels
Their exact pronunciation depends on the quality of the surrounding consonants.  is realized as a front  between two slender consonants (e.g. 'country'). Between a slender and a broad consonant, the tongue is retracted slightly from this position (for which the IPA symbol is ), e.g. ('sale'),   ('berry' gen.). Between two broad consonants, the tongue is retracted even further, almost to the point of being a central vowel (in IPA):   ('sheep').  is a fully back  between broad consonants (e.g. 'fort'), but between a broad and a slender consonant, the tongue is somewhat advanced (IPA ), e.g. ('three people'),   ('eye'). Between two slender consonants, it is advanced even further, to a centralized vowel (IPA ):   ('quiet').

The near-close vowels  and  show a similar pattern.  is realized between slender consonants as a front , e.g.   ('house' dat.). After a slender consonant and before a broad one, it is a near-front , e.g.   ('piece'). After a broad consonant and before a slender one, it is a more retracted , e.g.   ('understands'). Finally, between two broad consonants it is a central , e.g.   ('salty').  is a near-back  when all adjacent consonants are broad, e.g.   ('black'), and a more centralized  after a slender consonant, e.g.   ('rag').

Mid vowels

The realization of the long close-mid vowels  and  varies according to the quality of the surrounding consonants.  is a front  between two slender consonants (e.g.   'yell'), a centralized  between a broad and a slender consonant (e.g.   'call'), and a more open centralized  between two broad consonants (e.g.   'danger').  ranges from a back  between two broad consonants (e.g.   'turf') to an advanced  between a broad and a slender consonant (e.g.   'turf' [gen.]) to a centralized  between two slender consonants (e.g.   'music' [gen.]).

The short open-mid vowels also vary depending on their environment. Short  ranges from a front  between slender consonants (e.g. 'will be') to a retracted  between a broad and a slender consonant (e.g. 'I will be',   'was') to a central  when the only adjacent consonant is broad (e.g. 'cross' [dat.]). Short  between two broad consonants is usually a back , e.g. ('stone'), but it is a centralized  adjacent to nasal consonants and labial consonants, e.g. Between a broad and a slender consonant, it is a more open :   ('school'),   ('drink').

Unstressed  is realized as a near-close, near-front  when adjacent to a palatal consonant, e.g.   ('pike'). Next to other slender consonants, it is a mid-centralized , e.g.   ('salt water'). Adjacent to broad consonants, it is usually a mid central , e.g.   ('information'), but when the preceding syllable contains one of the close back vowels , it is realized as a mid-centralized back , e.g.   ('closing'),   ('pigs').

Open vowels

The realization of the open vowels varies according to the quality of the surrounding consonants; there is a significant difference between Munster dialects and Connacht dialects as well. In Munster, long  and short  have approximately the same range of realization: both vowels are relatively back in contact with broad consonants and relatively front in contact with slender consonants. Specifically, long  in word-initial position and after broad consonants is a back , e.g. ('place'),   ('beach'). Between a slender and a broad consonant, it is a retracted front , e.g. ('will cut'), while between two slender consonants it is a fully front , e.g. ('John' voc.). In Dingle, the back allophone is rounded to  after broad labials, e.g. Between a broad and a slender consonant, it is in most cases a retracted , e.g. ('town'),   ('injure'). When it is adjacent only to broad consonants, it is a centralized back , e.g. ('son'),   ('say').

In Connacht varieties, the allophones of short  are consistently further front than the allophones of long . In Erris, for example, short  ranges from a near-open front vowel  before slender consonants (e.g. 'earwax') to an open  after slender consonants (e.g. 'bright') to a centralized back  between broad consonants (e.g. 'horse'). Long , on the other hand, ranges from a back  between broad consonants (e.g. 'boat') to an advanced back  before slender consonants (e.g. 'to get') to a centralized back  after slender consonants (e.g. 'fine'). In Toormakeady, the back allophone is rounded to  after broad labials, e.g. ('white').

Diphthongs

The starting point of  ranges from a near-open central  after broad consonants to an open-mid centralized front  after slender consonants, and its end point ranges from a near-close near-front  before slender consonants to a centralized  before broad consonants.

The starting point of  ranges from a near-open central  after broad consonants to an open-mid advanced central  after slender consonants, and its end point ranges from a near-close near-back  before broad consonants to a centralized  before slender consonants. ('goat').

The starting point of  ranges from a close front  after slender consonants to a retracted  after word-initial broad  (the only context in which it appears after a broad consonant). Its end point ranges from a mid central  before broad consonants to a close-mid centralized front  before slender consonants.

Nasalized vowels
In general, vowels in Irish are nasalized when adjacent to nasal consonants. For some speakers, there are reported to be minimal pairs between nasal vowels and oral vowels, indicating that nasal vowels are also separate phonemes; these generally result from an earlier nasalized semivowel  (historically the lenited version of ), that has since been lost. However, the contrast is not robust in any dialect; most published descriptions say that contrastively nasal vowels are present in the speech of only some (usually older) speakers. Potential minimal pairs include those shown in the table below.

In addition, where a vowel is nasalized because it is adjacent to a nasal consonant, it often retains its nasalization in related forms where the consonant is no longer nasal.

Phonotactics
The most interesting aspects of Irish phonotactics revolve around the behaviour of consonant clusters. Here it is important to distinguish between clusters that occur at the beginnings of words and those that occur after vowels, although there is overlap between the two groups.

Word-initial consonant clusters

Irish words can begin with clusters of two or three consonants. In general, all the consonants in a cluster agree in their quality, i.e. either all are broad or all are slender. Further, the cluster  occurs in the word   ('women') and a few forms related to it.

One exception to quality agreement is that broad  is found before slender labials (and for some speakers in Connemara and Dingle before  as well).

In the environment of an initial consonant mutation, there is a much wider range of possible onset clusters; for example, in a lenition environment the following occur:   ('tasted'),   ('broke'),   ('practiced'),   ('bent'),   ('stuck'),   ('acted'),   ('slipped'),   ('swam'),   ('reached'). In an eclipsis environment, the following are found:   ('flower'),   ('years'),   ('you would break'),   ('warp'),   ('bridge'),   ('ladder'),   ('you would dress'),   ('you would leave'),   ('you would act').

In Donegal, Mayo, and Connemara dialects (but not usually on the Aran Islands), the coronal nasals  can follow only  respectively in a word-initial cluster. After other consonants, they are replaced by :   ('hill'),   ('women'),   ('liking'),   ('long for').

Under lenition,  become  as expected in these dialects, but after the definite article an they become :   ('snow'),   ('snow' [lenited form]),   ('the snow' gen.).

Post-vocalic consonant clusters and epenthesis

Like word-initial consonant clusters, post-vocalic consonant clusters usually agree in broad or slender quality. The only exception here is that broad , not slender , appears before the slender coronals :   ('two people'),   ('trade'),   ('doors'),   ('handle'),   ('advice').

There is no epenthesis, however, if the vowel preceding the cluster is long or a diphthong:   ('wrinkle'),   ('term'),   ('insight'),   ('duty'). There is also no epenthesis into words that are at least three syllables long:   ('firmament'),   ('throat'),   ('dandelion'),   ('Carmelite').

Phonological processes

Vowel-initial words
Vowel-initial words in Irish exhibit behaviour that has led linguists to suggest that the vowel sound they begin with on the surface is not actually the first sound in the word at a more abstract level. Specifically, when a clitic ending in a consonant precedes a word beginning with the vowel, the consonant of the clitic surfaces as either broad or slender, depending on the specific word in question.

One analysis of these facts is that vowel-initial words actually begin, at an abstract level of representation, with a kind of "empty" consonant that consists of nothing except the information "broad" or "slender". Another analysis is that vowel-initial words, again at an abstract level, all begin with one of two semivowels, one triggering palatalization and the other triggering velarization of a preceding consonant.

Lengthening before fortis sonorants
Where reflexes of the Old Irish fortis sonorants appear in syllable-final position (in some cases, only in word-final position), they trigger a lengthening or diphthongization of the preceding vowel in most dialects of Irish. The details vary from dialect to dialect.

In Donegal and Mayo, lengthening is found only before , before  (except when a vowel follows), and in a few words also before word-final , e.g.   ('top'),   ('tall'),   ('inch'),   ('spinning wheel'),   ('yonder').

In Connemara, the Aran Islands, and Munster, lengthening is found generally not only in the environments listed above, but also before  (unless a vowel follows) and before word-final .

Because vowels behave differently before broad sonorants than before slender ones in many cases, and because there is generally no lengthening (except by analogy) when the sonorants are followed by a vowel, there is a variety of vowel alternations between different related word-forms. For example, in Dingle  ('head') is pronounced  with a diphthong, but  (the genitive singular of the same word) is pronounced  with a long vowel, while  (the plural, meaning 'heads') is pronounced  with a short vowel.

This lengthening has received a number of different explanations within the context of theoretical phonology. All accounts agree that some property of the fortis sonorant is being transferred to the preceding vowel, but the details about what property that is vary from researcher to researcher.  argue that the fortis sonorant is tense (a term only vaguely defined phonetically) and that this tenseness is transferred to the vowel, where it is realized phonetically as vowel length and/or diphthongization.  argues that the triggering consonant is underlyingly associated with a unit of syllable weight called a mora; this mora then shifts to the vowel, creating a long vowel or a diphthong.  expands on that analysis to argue that the fortis sonorants have an advanced tongue root (that is, the bottom of the tongue is pushed upward during articulation of the consonant) and that diphthongization is an articulatory effect of this tongue movement.

Devoicing
Devoicing is found most prominently in the future of first conjugation verbs (where  is spelled ) and in the formation of verbal adjectives (where  is spelled ). For example, the verb   ('sweep') ends in the voiced consonant , but its future tense   ('will sweep') and verbal adjective   ('swept') have the voiceless consonant .

Sandhi
Irish exhibits a number of external sandhi effects, i.e. phonological changes across word boundaries, particularly in rapid speech. The most common type of sandhi in Irish is assimilation, which means that a sound changes its pronunciation in order to become more similar to an adjacent sound. One type of assimilation in Irish is found when a coronal consonant changes from being broad to being slender before a word that begins with a slender coronal consonant and vice versa. For example,   ('deceive') ends with a broad , but in the phrase   ('it deceived me'), the  has become slender because the following word, starts with a slender coronal consonant.

 may also assimilate to the place of articulation of a following consonant, becoming labial before a labial consonant, palatal before a palatal consonant, and velar before a velar consonant.

Stress

General facts of stress placement
In Irish, words normally have only one stressed syllable (ˈ◌), namely the first syllable of the word, e.g. However, certain words, especially adverbs and loanwords, have stress on a noninitial syllable, e.g. ('only'),   ('tobacco').

In most compound words, primary stress falls on the first member and a secondary stress (ˌ◌) falls on the second member, e.g.   ('spent bog'). Some compounds, however, have primary stress on both the first and the second member, e.g.   ('a terrible lie').

In Munster, stress is attracted to a long vowel or diphthong in the second or third syllable of a word, e.g. ('girl'),   ('request'). In the now-extinct accent of East Mayo, stress was attracted to a long vowel or diphthong in the same way as in Munster; in addition, stress was attracted to a short vowel before word-final  when that word was also final in its utterance.

('listen'),   ('wether').

The nature of unstressed vowels
In general, short vowels are all reduced to schwa in unstressed syllables, but there are exceptions. ('scythe-man'). ('art'),   ('gather'). ('girl'),   ('gallon'). In Ulster, unstressed  before  is not reduced to schwa, e.g. ('cattle').

Samples
The following table shows some sample sentences from the Aran dialect.

The first eight chapters of Peadar Ua Laoghaire's autobiography Mo Sgéal Féin at Wikisource include recordings of the text being read by a native speaker of Muskerry (Munster) Irish.

Comparison with other languages

Scottish Gaelic and Manx

Many of the phonological processes found in Irish are found also in its nearest relatives, Scottish Gaelic and Manx. For example, both languages contrast "broad" and "slender" consonants, but only at the coronal and dorsal places of articulation; both Scottish Gaelic and Manx have lost the distinction in labial consonants. The change of  etc. to  etc. is found in Manx and most dialects of Scottish Gaelic. Evidence from written manuscripts suggests it had begun in Scottish Gaelic as early as the 16th century and was well established in both Scottish Gaelic and Manx by the late 17th to early 18th century. Lengthening or diphthongization of vowels before fortis sonorants is also found in both languages. The stress pattern of Scottish Gaelic is the same as that in Connacht and Ulster Irish, while in Manx, stress is attracted to long vowels and diphthongs in noninitial syllables, but under more restricted conditions than in Munster.

Manx and many dialects of Scottish Gaelic share with Ulster Irish the property of not reducing unstressed  to  before .

Hiberno-English
Irish pronunciation has had a significant influence on the features of Hiberno-English. For example, most of the vowels of Hiberno-English (with the exception of ) correspond to vowel phones of Irish. The Irish stops  are common realizations of the English phonemes . Hiberno-English also allows  where it is permitted in Irish but excluded in other dialects of English, such as before an unstressed vowel (e.g. Haughey ) and at the end of a word (e.g. McGrath ). There is epenthesis in words like film  and form .

Notes
  is pronounced as if spelled *; see Irish orthography
  is pronounced as if spelled 
  is pronounced as if spelled 
  is pronounced as if spelled 
  is pronounced as if spelled *
  is pronounced as if spelled *
  is pronounced as if spelled 
  is pronounced as if spelled 
  is pronounced as if spelled 
  is pronounced as if spelled 
  is pronounced as if spelled 
  is pronounced as if spelled *

Footnotes

References

 
 
 
 
 
 
 
 
 
 
 
 
 
 
 
 
 
 
 
 
 
 
 
 
 
 . Reprinted 1972 by the Dublin Institute for Advanced Studies, .

See also
  – "The Official Standard", for writing Irish

External links
 Studies in Irish Phonology
 Caint Ros Muc, a collection of sound files of speakers from Rosmuck
The Irish of Iorras Aithneach, County Galway, a detailed publicly available study on the Irish spoken in Iorras Aithneach
 Irish phonology
 Recordings of the sounds of Irish
 Pronunciation hints for learners 
 Fuaimeanna na Gaeilge, listen to different phonemes in three different dialects
 glottothèque - Ancient Indo-European Grammars online, an online collection on Ancient Indo-European languages, including videos on the phonology of Old Irish

Phonology
Celtic phonologies